The 1892 United States presidential election in Oregon took place on November 8, 1892. All contemporary 44 states were part of the 1892 United States presidential election. State voters chose four electors to the Electoral College, which selected the president and vice president.

Oregon was won by the Republican nominees, incumbent President Benjamin Harrison of Indiana and his running mate Whitelaw Reid of New York. The direct election of Presidential Electors combined with the fact that one Weaver elector was endorsed by the Democratic Party and elected as a Fusionist, resulted in a split between the Republican and Populist electors: three for Harrison and one for Weaver.

Results

Results by county

See also
 United States presidential elections in Oregon

Notes

References

Oregon
1892
1892 Oregon elections